Pillow Place also known as Pillow-Haliday Place is an historic plantation mansion located southwest of the city of Columbia, Maury County, Tennessee on Campbellsville Pike.

History 
Gideon Pillow, a surveyor that had moved to Maury County, left  to be divided among his three sons. The Pillow-Haliday Place mansion and plantation buildings were built by master builder Nathan Vaught in 1850, for Major Granville A. Pillow (b.1805 in Columbia, TN; d.1868 in Clifton, TN), and was the second of three Pillow homes built. Vaught also built Clifton Place (1839) for Gideon Johnson Pillow, and Pillow-Bethel House (1855) for Jerome Bonaparte Pillow. The three mansions were closely designed but Pillow Place lacked the second story gallery and the portico had a low parapet at the top instead of a pediment. The mansion was built on the site of Gideon Pillow's old home.

NRHP 
The mansion was placed on the National Register of Historic Places listings in Maury County, Tennessee on December 8, 1983.

References 

Houses on the National Register of Historic Places in Tennessee
Houses in Columbia, Tennessee
Houses completed in 1850
1850 establishments in Tennessee
National Register of Historic Places in Maury County, Tennessee